Major Thomas "Robin" Valerian Dixon, 3rd Baron Glentoran,  (born 21 April 1935), is a former British bobsledder and Northern Irish politician, known as Robin Dixon. He is a former Conservative Party Shadow Minister for the Olympics.

Early life
Dixon was educated at Eton and Grenoble in France. After university, he served with the Grenadier Guards from 1954 to 1966, including service in the Cyprus Emergency.

Sports career
In 1964, Dixon was granted leave from the army to participate in the 1964 Winter Olympics at Innsbruck, where he won the gold medal in the Two-man Bobsleigh as brakeman to Tony Nash. Nash and Dixon also won three medals in the two-man event at the FIBT World Championships with one gold (1965) and two bronzes (1963, 1966).

Dixon retained his sporting links throughout his life: he was President of the Jury at the 1976 Winter Olympics, set up the Ulster Games Foundation in 1983, and was appointed Chairman of the Northern Ireland Tall Ships Council in 1987. He has been President of the British Bobsleigh Association since 1987.

Business
Dixon retired from the army in 1966 with the rank of Major and went on to work for Kodak in their public relations department and in 1971 joined the Northern Irish business, Redland Tile and Brick Ltd, which he built up into a multimillion-pound subsidiary of Redland plc and became managing director. In 1983, he was appointed High Sheriff of Antrim.

Upon the 1995 death of his father, the 2nd Baron Glentoran, Dixon inherited his title, and he retired from business in 1998.

Political career
Dixon was Chairman of Positively Belfast from 1992 to 1996, Chairman of the "Growing a Green Economy" Committee from 1993 to 1995 and has been Shadow Minister for Northern Ireland, Shadow Minister for Sport and Shadow Minister for Environment, Food and Rural Affairs. He is also a member of the British-Irish Parliamentary Body.

Lord Glentoran was one of 92 hereditary peers that remain in the House of Lords after the passing of the House of Lords Act 1999, and sat on the Conservative benches until his retirement from the House on 1 June 2018.

Personal life
Lord Glentoran has three sons from his first wife, Rona (divorced in 1975), and lives with his third wife, Margaret, in their family home, Drumadarragh House, near Ballyclare. His eldest son, Daniel, has two sons; his second, Andrew, a son and a daughter, and his youngest, Patrick, has one daughter.

Honours
Dixon and his driver, Tony Nash, were inducted into the British Bobsleigh Hall of Fame as a result of their success. In the 1969 New Year Honours, Dixon was appointed Member of the Order of the British Empire (MBE), as was Nash, for services to winter sports. A curve at the St. Moritz-Celerina Olympic Bobrun is named for both Nash and Dixon.

In 1987, Dixon was appointed Honorary Colonel of the 5th Battalion, Royal Irish Rangers (27th (Inniskilling), 83rd and 87th).

Dixon was promoted to Commander of the Order of the British Empire (CBE) in the 1992 Birthday Honours for services to sport and to the community in Northern Ireland.

See also
 List of Northern Ireland Members of the House of Lords

References

External links
 Robin Dixon profile Stratagem
 Bobsleigh two-man Olympic medalists 1932-56 and since 1964 Sports 123
 Bobsleigh two-man world championship medalists since 1931 Sports 123
 Hall of Fame British Bobsleigh Association
 
 St. Moritz, Switzerland bobsleigh and skeleton track map featuring the Nash-Dixon corner.  Olympia Bobrun
 Wallenchinsky, David (1984) "Bobsled: Two-man". In The Complete Book of the Olympics: 1896-1980 New York: Penguin Books; p. 559
 
 

1935 births
Living people
Barons in the Peerage of the United Kingdom
Bobsledders at the 1964 Winter Olympics
Bobsledders at the 1968 Winter Olympics
British male bobsledders
Commanders of the Order of the British Empire
Conservative Party (UK) hereditary peers
Grenadier Guards officers
High Sheriffs of Antrim
People educated at Eton College
British military personnel of the Cyprus Emergency
Olympic bobsledders of Great Britain
Olympic gold medallists for Great Britain
People from Ballyclare
Olympic medalists in bobsleigh
British sportsperson-politicians
Medalists at the 1964 Winter Olympics
Hereditary peers elected under the House of Lords Act 1999